Aksaite (Mg[B6O7(OH)6]·2H2O) is a mineral found in Kazakhstan.

Etymology and History
Aksaite is named after the place it was discovered, Ak-say (lit. White Glen). It was found in 1963 in Chelkar Salt Dome, Ak-say Valley, Kazakhstan.

References

Nesoborates
Magnesium minerals